Kenneth Robertson Dempster (1924 – 6 March 2001),also known as Claude Dempster, was a British pathologist at the King Edward VII Hospital, Windsor, who in 1945, while studying at St Thomas' Hospital, assisted at Bergen-Belsen concentration camp when he volunteered as a medical student.

References

20th-century British medical doctors
London medical students who assisted at Belsen
1945 in medicine
1924 births
2001 deaths
British pathologists